Raghadan Palace is a crown palace located in the Royal Court compound of Al-Maquar in Amman, Jordan. Constructed in 1926, the property became the residence of King Abdullah I who would go on to order the construction of several more palaces in the surrounding area. The palace is constructed in a traditional Islamic style, with colored glass windows modeled on the al-Aqsa Mosque in Jerusalem. 

Raghadan Palace is used for hosting meetings with visiting heads of state and for other ceremonial events, including the presentation and acceptance of new ambassadors' diplomatic credentials, and for replies to the speech from the throne following the state opening of Parliament. In 2006, for example, President George W. Bush met with King Abdullah II there.

The palace cost £1,600 to build in 1926. It was renovated in the late 1980s following a fire in 1983. The current monarch does not live at the property.

The palace is guarded by a ceremonial unit of Circassian guards, who also patrol the Basman Palace.

An image of the palace appears on 50-dinar banknotes of the Jordanian dinar.

References

Buildings and structures in Amman
Houses completed in 1926
Architecture in Jordan
Palaces in Jordan
Burial sites of the House of Hashim
1926 establishments in Transjordan